Bettles Lodge, located a few miles from Bettles, Alaska on the south bank of the Koyukuk River in the Brooks Range, was built in 1951 by Warren Killen and Wilfred Evans. It has served as a hotel and restaurant and was listed on the National Register of Historic Places in 1997. The listing included two contributing buildings: a first lodge built in 1948 and a second built in 1951. The lodge buildings are significant because it is the oldest (and first) in the community, and it served as an air transportation hub for the northern interior area of Alaska.

It is about 25 miles north of the Arctic Circle.

See also
National Register of Historic Places listings in Yukon–Koyukuk Census Area, Alaska

References

External References
Bettles Lodge website

Buildings and structures completed in 1951
Buildings and structures in Yukon–Koyukuk Census Area, Alaska
Commercial buildings on the National Register of Historic Places in Alaska
Hotel buildings on the National Register of Historic Places in Alaska
Buildings and structures on the National Register of Historic Places in Yukon–Koyukuk Census Area, Alaska